Driss Bamous (15 December 1942 – 16 April 2015) was a Moroccan football midfielder. He was also a trained professional soldier at the military academy of Saint Cyr, France.

Career
Bamous played club football for FAR Rabat in the Botola. Bamous played for the Morocco national football team at the 1964 Summer Olympics and at the 1970 FIFA World Cup finals. Following his playing career, Bamous became the president of the FRMF and organized the 1988 African Cup of Nations in Morocco. In 2006, he was selected by CAF as one of the best 200 African football players of the last 50 years. He was promoted to brigadier general of the Royal Moroccan Gendarmerie in 2003.

Death
Bamous died in Rabat from a long-term illness.

References

External links 
 

1942 births
2015 deaths
Moroccan footballers
Morocco international footballers
1970 FIFA World Cup players
Footballers at the 1964 Summer Olympics
Olympic footballers of Morocco
Competitors at the 1967 Mediterranean Games
People from Berrechid
Moroccan generals
Association football midfielders
Botola players
AS FAR (football) players
AS FAR (football) managers
Moroccan football managers
Mediterranean Games competitors for Morocco